Susanne Hartel (born 2 February 1988 in Mannheim) is a German football player.

Career

Club football 

She started her career in the age of three years at MFC 08 Lindenhof. In 2002, she had to change the club because in Germany it is not allowed that girls play together with the boys if they are older than 14 years and her current club had no girls' team at that time. She joined Viktoria Neckarhausen where she stayed for one and a half years.

In 2003, the striker changed to 1. FFC Frankfurt. Playing for the junior team until she became 16, she played for the first team in the Bundesliga, the German Cup and also the UEFA Women's Cup.

In 2007, she joined the SC Freiburg where she got a place in the Starting Eleven, immediately. In the season 2008-09 she came to the seventh place of the league's top scorer ranking by scoring twelve goals in 17 games.

Honours:

 UEFA Women's Cup-Winner 2006
 German Champion 2005 and 2007
 German Cup Winner 2007
 DFB-Hallenpokal Winner 2006

National team 

She made her first cap in the Germany under-15 team for which she played twice. After that, she scored two goals in two caps for the Germany under-17 team.

For the Germany under-19 team, with which she became European Champion in 2007, she played twelve times and scored four goals. Her most important goal was the pre-deciding 3-2 in the extra time of the championship’s semi-final against the French team, which the German squad won 4-2 in the end.

Afterwards, she played once for the Germany under-20 team.
 
Actually, she belongs to the Germany under-23 team, for which she made twelve games and scored two goals up to now.

Honours:

 Under-19 European Champion 2007

Personal life

She has cited Birgit Prinz and Torsten Frings as role models.

External links 

   Official Website of Susanne Hartel
  Profile at DFB’s Official Website

References 

SC Freiburg (women) players
1. FFC Frankfurt players
Women's association football forwards
German women's footballers
Footballers from Mannheim
1988 births
Living people

Association football forwards
Germany women's international footballers
Germany women's youth international footballers